The Theory of Harmonial Value is the second release by the rock band Moneen. This is also their first full-length album. The album is named after the papers of Dr. Lozlo Pronowski, a fictional scientist created by the band. At the end of the track, "The Passing of America", an instrumental demo version of "Closing My Eyes Won't Help Me Leave" can be heard, which was later included on "Are We Really Happy With Who We Are Right Now".

Track listing

Moneen albums
2001 debut albums